Adoretus abdolrezagharibi is a scarab beetle, and a member of the genus Adoretus.

Range
The species is listed in the check-list of Iranian Coleoptera.

References

Rutelinae